This list of the highest cities in the world includes only cities with a population greater than 100,000 inhabitants and an average height above sea level over . For other settlements, see List of highest cities in the world or List of highest towns by country.

See also
List of cities by elevation

References

Cities-related lists of superlatives
Urban geography
 Highest
Cities, large
Geography-related lists